Tokiwabashi Tower is a skyscraper at the Tokyo Torch redevelopment district in Tokyo, Japan. It was completed on June 30, 2021, as the 28th tallest building in Japan.

Location
Tokiwabashi Tower is 212 meters tall and is located on the former site of the JX Building and the Daiwa Gofukubashi Building, near Tokyo Station. Also known as Tower A, it is one of two skyscrapers at the redevelopment site, the other one being the Torch Tower, which will be 390 meters tall when it is completed in 2027.

Building
Tokiwabashi Tower has 43 floors in total, of which 38 are above ground and 5 below ground—with 3 of them being used as a parking garage. The ground and first floors of the tower have retail areas and restaurants with seats facing the district's plaza, which will cover an area of 7,000-square meters when it is completed in 2027.

The third and eighth floors at Tokiwabashi Tower are shared spaces with a mix of cafeterias, meeting rooms and event spaces. All other floors are used for offices.

See also
 Tokyo Torch, the entire district
 Torch Tower, the second skyscraper at Tokyo Torch
 List of tallest structures in Japan

References

External links
 Official website

Skyscrapers in Tokyo
Retail buildings in Tokyo
Buildings and structures in Chiyoda, Tokyo
Commercial buildings completed in 2021
2021 establishments in Japan